The Reverend George Evans Brewer (October 31, 1832January 23, 1922) was an American historian, educator, legislator, and Baptist minister from the State of Alabama.  He held office in the Alabama State Senate (1859–1863) and the Alabama House of Representatives (1857–1859), was elected to the office of Superintendent of Education of the County of Coosa, Alabama in 1856, and was appointed Adjutant General of Alabama by Governor Robert M. Patton in 1866.

References

Historians from Alabama
19th-century American historians
19th-century American male writers
1832 births
1922 deaths
Baptist ministers from the United States
Confederate States Army officers
Alabama state senators
Members of the Alabama House of Representatives
Educators from Alabama
American male non-fiction writers